 
Samuli Lintula (born 1971), who goes under the penname Samson, is a Finnish cartoonist best known for the comic strip Dark Side of the Horse.

Biography 
Lintula grew up in Finland, reading comics such as Donald Duck, B.C., Peanuts, and Beetle Bailey.  He attended college for two semesters and managed to sell cartoons to Finnish magazines during this time. In 1994 after dropping out of college, he began contributing to the Finnish cartoon magazine Myrkky which he continued until its discontinuation in 2008.

From 1998, Lintula worked to get a cartoon syndicated. In 2008, he had the idea for "Dark Side of the Horse". This comic has been syndicated by Royal Comics Syndicate and appears on GoComics.

Published works 
 2013: Year of the Horse: A Dark Side of the Horse Collection

References 

1971 births
Living people
Finnish cartoonists